The Hudson River Waterfront Walkway, also known as the Hudson River Walkway, is a promenade along the Hudson Waterfront in New Jersey. The ongoing and incomplete project located on Kill van Kull and the western shore of Upper New York Bay and the Hudson River was implemented as part of a New Jersey state-mandated master plan to connect the municipalities from the Bayonne Bridge to the George Washington Bridge with an urban linear park and provide contiguous unhindered access to the water's edge.

There is no projected date for its completion, though large segments have been built or incorporated into it since its inception. The southern end in Bayonne may eventually connect to the Hackensack RiverWalk, another proposed walkway along Newark Bay and Hackensack River on the west side of the Hudson County peninsula, and form part of a proposed Harbor Ring around the harbor. Its northern end is in Palisades Interstate Park, allowing users to continue along the river bank and alpine paths to the New Jersey/New York state line and beyond. (A connection to the Long Path, a  hiking trail with terminus near Albany, is feasible.)

As of 2007, eleven miles (18 km) of walkway have been completed, with an additional five miles (8 km) designated HRWW along Broadway in Bayonne. A part of the East Coast Greenway, or ECG, a project to create a nearly 3000-mile (4828 km) urban path linking the major cities along the Atlantic coast runs concurrent with the HRWW.

In 2013 the walkway showed signs of age. Some of the pilings on which it is built succumbed to marine worms and effects of Hurricane Sandy in New Jersey, which undermined bedding.

Route

It is considerably longer as it follows the contour of the shoreline.

It traverses established residential and commercial areas, re-developed piers, wetland preservation zones, industrial and transportation infrastructure, and is dotted with public and private marinas and parks. Expansive views of the water and the New York skyline can be seen from most of its length. It passes through the following municipalities, which have combined population of approximately 545,000, as of the 2010 census.

Bayonne (63,024)
Jersey City (247,597) The walkway here runs from Chapel Avenue through Port Liberte, past Liberty National Golf Club, and through Liberty State Park to Jersey Avenue. Another segment runs from Exchange Place through Newport to Hoboken.
Hoboken (50,005)
Weehawken (12,554)
West New York (49,708)
Guttenberg (11,176)
North Bergen (60,773)
Edgewater (11,513)
Fort Lee (35,345)

History
A walkway or promenade along the northeastern New Jersey waterfront was first discussed at a state level in the late 1970s. In 1988, the New Jersey Department of Environmental Protection created the Coastal Zone Management Rules, which outlined the regulations and specifications for its construction. Construction must be permitted by the agency and paid for by the developer. In 1999, the National Association of Home Builders and the New Jersey Builders Association challenged the obligation in court as an unfair taking of private property under eminent domain, saying that property owners should be compensated as specified by the "Takings clause" of the Fifth Amendment. A federal judge rejected the suit, upholding a state rule that requires property owners to provide access to the waterfront. By the end of 2019, most of the Walkway was complete. Only seven "gaps" remain to be built from Liberty State Park in Jersey City to the George Washington Bridge. Major sections of the Walkway remain unbuilt in industrial Bayonne.

Parks and points of interest 

Bergen Point
Bayonne Bridge, world's third-longest steel arch bridge
Collins Park
Bradys Dock
former Standard Oil Tank Cleaning Services/Texaco Tank Farm
Port Johnson
Constable Hook
Robbins Reef Light
Bayonne Golf Course - site of most extensive brownfields reclamation project in New Jersey
The Peninsula at Bayonne Harbor, site of former Military Ocean Terminal at Bayonne
Tear of Grief - gift from Russia commemorating September 11, 2001
Cape Liberty Cruise Port
Port Jersey
Waterfront Observation Tower and bird sanctuary for endangered least tern
Greenville Yards
Liberty National Golf Course-southern section
Caven Point
Caven Athletic Complex
US Army Corps of Engineers station
Port Liberte
Liberty State Park-Caven Point Branch
US Army Reserve Center
Liberty National Golf Course-main section
Liberty State Park
Black Tom, site of World War I sabotage explosion
Central Railroad of New Jersey Terminal
Hornblower Cruises ferry to Ellis Island and Liberty Island
Liberty Science Center
Morris Canal Big Basin
Paulus Hook
Liberty State Park-Peninsula Park
Morris Canal-Little Basin
Colgate Clock, with claims to being the world's largest
Goldman Sachs Tower, tallest building in New Jersey.
Exchange Place, downtown Jersey City's "financial" district
Katyń Memorial
Pavonia
Hudson and Manhattan Railroad Powerhouse
Harsimus Cove site one of early  European settlements
Pavonia/Newport, site  of Erie Railroad's Pavonia Terminal (1861–1958)
Holland Tunnel Ventilation Tower, with twin across river
Water's Soul (2021) sculpture
13 panel exhibition of history of environment, development of lower Hudson River
Long Slip
Hoboken
Hoboken Terminal, 1908 national landmark and major transportation hub
Pier A
Marineview Plaza, urban renewal project in the Brutalist style
Stevens Institute of Technology
Castle Point, serpentine rock bluff
Sybil's Cave, long-abandoned site of spring and inspiration for Edgar Allan Poe's "The Mystery of Marie Roget"
Elysian Park
Maxwell Place i previous home of Maxwell House coffee
Hudson Tea Building, massive former Lipton Tea plant
Weehawken
Weehawken Cove, where Henry Hudson's Half Moon anchored in 1609
Lincoln Harbor
Riva Point
The Atrium, home to events sponsored by the proposed Hudson River Performing Arts Center
King's Bluff, at the foot of which the Burr-Hamilton duel took place in 1804
Lincoln Tunnel Ventilation Towers
Weehawken park and Municipal Athletic Fields
Hudson Riverfront 9/11 Memorial
West Shore Railroad Tunnel, used by Hudson-Bergen Light Rail
Weehawken Port Imperial
Guttenberg
Galaxy Towers, a trio of octagonal highrises built in the late 1970s 
Palisades Medical Center (North Bergen)
Edgewater
Edgewater Harbor
Municipal Building
Edgewater Cemetery, with 19th and 20th century graves
Previous site of the Binghamton, decommissioned ferry and registered national historic place
Mitsuwa Marketplace
Old Municipal Building now a museum
Edgewater Landing
Veterans Park/Edgewater Community Center-site of plaque commemorating Vriessendael, the first European settlement in what would become contemporary Bergen County
Edgewater Colony
Palisades Interstate Park
Mt. Constitution, atop which sits Fort Lee Historic Park, site of George Washington's 1776 encampment Fort Constitution
George Washington Bridge

See also

References

External links 
Bergen County HRWW
 Global Marine Terminal
 Bayonne masterplan
 Hudson River Waterfront
The Harbor Ring Project

Protected areas of Bergen County, New Jersey
Protected areas of Hudson County, New Jersey
Hudson River
Hiking trails in New Jersey
Redeveloped ports and waterfronts in the United States
Port of New York and New Jersey
Parks in Hudson County, New Jersey
Parks on the Hudson River